The Palo Verde Mountains are a mountain range in northeastern Imperial County, California. They are located along the west side of the Colorado River in the Lower Colorado River Valley and Colorado Desert. Palo Verde Peak, which rises to about 1,800 feet in the southern portion, is the highest point in the area. Thumb Peak stands to the north. Clapp Spring, a palm oasis, is located east of Thumb Peak. Clapp Spring is the only permanent water source in the area for wildlife species.

References

External links
Palo Verde Mountains Wilderness - BLM

Mountain ranges of the Lower Colorado River Valley
Mountain ranges of the Colorado Desert
Mountain ranges of Imperial County, California